Larisa Savchenko and Natasha Zvereva were the defending champions and won in the final 7–5, 5–7, 6–0 against Leila Meskhi and Svetlana Parkhomenko.

Seeds
Champion seeds are indicated in bold text while text in italics indicates the round in which those seeds were eliminated. The top four seeded teams received byes into the second round.

Draw

Final

Top half

Bottom half

External links
 1989 Dow Chemical Classic Doubles Draw

Birmingham Classic (tennis)
1989 WTA Tour